Frank D'Amico (December 20, 1955 – June 1, 2008) was an American actor and stand-up comedian. He was perhaps best known for playing Armond in the 2007 film The Dukes.

D'Amico was born in Mount Vernon, New York, and attended Mount Vernon High School. After working as a truck driver, he began his career as a stand-up comedian, influenced by Jackie Gleason. D'Amico then made appearances on The Tonight Show with Jay Leno.

D'Amico appeared in films and television programs, with his credits including The Parkers, Kiss the Bride, Grounded for Life, Michael Hayes, NYPD Blue and Back to Back. He also played the recurring role of Chuck the Drain King in Becker. In 2007, he was asked to play the role of the comic character Armond in the film The Dukes. His final credit was from the film The Flyboys, in 2008.

D'Amico died in June 2008 from complications of diabetes at his home in California, at the age of 52.

References

External links 

Rotten Tomatoes profile

1955 births
2008 deaths
Deaths from diabetes
People from Mount Vernon, New York
Male actors from New York (state)
American male film actors
American male television actors
American stand-up comedians
20th-century American male actors
21st-century American male actors
20th-century American comedians
21st-century American comedians